The Newton Lamson House is a historic house at 33 Chestnut Street in the Nobility Hill section of Stoneham, Massachusetts.  Built c. 1887, it is one of Stoneham's finest Queen Anne/Stick style houses.  It has a rectangular plan, with a gable roof that has a cross gable centered on the south side.  The gable ends are clad in decorative cut shingles, and the gables are decorated with Stick-style vergeboard elements.  Below the eaves hangs a decorative wave-patterned valance.  The porch has turned posts and balusters.  It is further enhanced by its position in the center of a group of stylish period houses, including the Sidney A. Hill House and the Franklin B. Jenkins House.

The house was listed on the National Register of Historic Places in 1984, and included in the Nobility Hill Historic District in 1990.

See also
National Register of Historic Places listings in Stoneham, Massachusetts
National Register of Historic Places listings in Middlesex County, Massachusetts

References

Houses on the National Register of Historic Places in Stoneham, Massachusetts
Queen Anne architecture in Massachusetts
Houses completed in 1887
Houses in Stoneham, Massachusetts
Historic district contributing properties in Massachusetts